Christopher Joseph Ford (January 11, 1949 – January 17, 2023) was an American professional basketball player and head coach in the National Basketball Association (NBA). Nicknamed "the Mad Bomber", Ford played most of his NBA career with the Detroit Pistons, before finishing his playing career with the Boston Celtics. In the Celtics' season opener in 1979–80, he was credited with making the first official three-point shot in NBA history. He won an NBA championship with the Celtics in 1981.

Between 1990 and 1995, Ford was the head coach of the Celtics, and proceeded to coach for three other NBA franchises for various stints until 2004.

Amateur career
A 6-foot-5 (1.96 m) guard from Atlantic City, Ford played high school basketball at Holy Spirit High School in Absecon, New Jersey. He averaged a Cape-Atlantic League record 33 ppg as a senior, and finished with 1,507 career points, which as of 2021, was still a school record. Ford then signed to play at Villanova University, sat out his first year as required at the time, and then quickly established himself, averaging 16.1 ppg, helping the team advance to the regional finals of the 1970 NCAA tournament, losing to St. Bonaventure 97–74, with the Bonnies led by 26 points by Bob Lanier, a future teammate of Ford with the Detroit Pistons.

Villanova and Ford continued their winning ways, advancing in the 1971 NCAA tournament to the championship game, losing to UCLA and legendary coach John Wooden 68–62. Ford averaged 13.8 ppg on the season.  In his senior year, Ford averaged a stellar 17.9 ppg, 6.4 rpg, again helping lead Villanova to the 1972 NCAA tournament, with the team losing in the regional semi-final to Penn 78–67. For his college career, Ford averaged 15.8 ppg, 6.0 rpg, leading Villanova to three consecutive NCAA appearances.

Professional career
Ford was drafted by the Detroit Pistons in the 1972 NBA draft (2nd round, 17th overall pick).  Ford established himself as a defensive oriented regular for Detroit, helping lead the team to four straight post-season berths (1974–1977).  His averages peaked in the tumultuous 1976-77 Detroit Pistons season with 12.3 ppg, 3.3 rpg, 4.1 apg, and 7th in steals (179) in the NBA.

In October 1978, he was traded by Detroit with a 1981 2nd round draft pick to the Boston Celtics for Earl Tatum.  He averaged a career high with 15.6 ppg in the 1978–79 season In 1979–80, the NBA introduced the three-point field goal to its game. In the Celtics' season opener against the Houston Rockets on October 12, 1979, Ford made a 3-pointer with 3:48 remaining in the first quarter.  Three days later, an NBA press release credited him with making the first 3-pointer in league history, due to his game being "the first games according to start time". Kevin Grevey of the Washington Bullets made a 3-pointer the same night against the Philadelphia 76ers, but his game started 35 minutes later than Ford's. It is not clear the exact time their respective baskets occurred. In 1980–81, the Celtics won the 1981 NBA Finals. He retired after the 1981–82 season with 10-year career averages of 9.2 ppg, 3.4 apg, and 1.6 steals per game, remaining in the top 100 for his career in steals per game.

Ford also appeared as a member of the Detroit team in the fantasy basketball comedy film The Fish That Saved Pittsburgh in 1979 alongside Pistons teammates Bob Lanier, Eric Money, John Shumate, Kevin Porter, and Leon Douglas.

Coaching career
Ford became an assistant coach with Boston, first under KC Jones and then Jimmy Rodgers, helping the Celtics to NBA championships in 1984 and 1986.  After Rodgers' dismissal, Ford was promoted to head coach for the Celtics (1990–95, 222–188, .541), and then dismissed, replaced by former Pistons and Celtics teammate ML Carr.   Ford then coached Milwaukee Bucks (1996–98, 69–95, .421), the Los Angeles Clippers (1999–2000, 20–75, .211), and finally the Philadelphia 76ers (2003–04, 12–18, .400). Ford coached the Eastern All-Stars in the 1991 NBA All-Star Game.  In addition to coaching at the professional level, Ford spent two seasons (2001–2003) as head basketball coach at Brandeis University, a Division III school in Waltham, Massachusetts.

Ford then became a scout for the 76ers and was also a coaching consultant for the New York Knicks.

Death
On January 17, 2023, six days after his 74th birthday, Ford died at a hospital in Philadelphia from complications of a heart attack he had earlier in the month.

Career statistics

NBA
Source:

Regular season

|-
| style="text-align:left;"|
| style="text-align:left;"|Detroit
| 74 ||  || 20.8 || .479 ||  || .645 || 3.6 || 2.6 ||  ||  || 6.4
|-
| style="text-align:left;"|
| style="text-align:left;"|Detroit
| style="background:#cfecec;"|82* ||  || 25.1 || .444 ||  || .740 || 3.7 || 3.4 || 1.8 || .2 || 7.1
|-
| style="text-align:left;"|
| style="text-align:left;"|Detroit
| 80 ||  || 24.5 || .474 ||  || .663 || 3.4 || 2.9 || 1.4 || .3 || 5.9
|-
| style="text-align:left;"|
| style="text-align:left;"|Detroit
| 82 ||  || 26.8 || .426 ||  || .722 || 3.5 || 3.3 || 2.2 || .3 || 8.4
|-
| style="text-align:left;"| 
| style="text-align:left;"| Detroit
| 82 ||  || 31.0 || .476 ||  || .771 || 3.3 || 4.1 || 2.2 || .3 || 12.3
|-
| style="text-align:left;"| 
| style="text-align:left;"| Detroit
| 82 ||  || 31.5 || .481 ||  || .734 || 3.3 || 4.6 || 2.0 || .2 || 10.5
|-
| style="text-align:left;"| 
| style="text-align:left;"| Detroit
| 3 ||  || 36.0 || .371 ||  || .875 || 6.0 || 1.7 || .3 || .3 || 11.0
|-
| style="text-align:left;"| 
| style="text-align:left;"| Boston
| 78 ||  || 33.7 || .474 ||  || .753 || 3.3 || 4.7 || 1.5 || .3 || 15.6
|-
| style="text-align:left;"| 
| style="text-align:left;"| Boston
| 73 || 73 || 29.0 || .465 || .427 || .754 || 2.5 || 2.9 || 1.5 || .4 || 11.2
|-
| style="text-align:left;background:#afe6ba;"|†
| style="text-align:left;"| Boston
| 82 || 75 || 33.2 || .443 || .330 || .736 || 2.0 || 3.6 || 1.2 || .3 || 8.9
|-
| style="text-align:left;"| 
| style="text-align:left;"| Boston
| 76 || 53 || 20.9 || .418 || .317 || .696 || 1.4 || 1.9 || .6 || .1 || 5.7
|- class="sortbottom"
| style="text-align:center;" colspan=2| Career
| 794 || 201 || 37.8 || .460 || .375 || .731 || 3.0 || 3.4 || 1.6 || .3 || 9.2

Playoffs

|-
| style="text-align:left;"| 1974
| style="text-align:left;"| Detroit
| 5 ||  || 18.8 || .471 ||  || .667 || 3.9 || 1.4 || .4 || .4 || 4.0
|-
| style="text-align:left;"| 1975
| style="text-align:left;"| Detroit
| 3 ||  || 27.3 || .545 ||  || – || 4.3 || 3.3 || .3 || .0 || 4.0
|-
| style="text-align:left;"| 1976
| style="text-align:left;"| Detroit
| 9 ||  || 30.7 || .407 ||  || .800 || 4.0 || 4.4 || 1.2 || .6 || 8.7
|-
| style="text-align:left;"| 1977
| style="text-align:left;"| Detroit
| 3 ||  || 33.7 || .409 ||  || .556 || 6.3 || 4.0 || 2.3 || .0 || 13.7
|-
| style="text-align:left;"| 1980
| style="text-align:left;"| Boston
| 9 ||  || 31.0 || .430 || .154 || .800 || 2.8 || 2.3 || 1.6 || .7 || 9.1
|-
| style="text-align:left;background:#afe6ba;"|1981†
| style="text-align:left;"|Boston
| 17 ||  || 29.8 || .452 || .280 || .600 || 2.6 || 2.7 || .8 || .1 || 9.1
|-
| style="text-align:left"| 1982
| style="text-align:left;"| Boston
| 12 ||  || 11.5 || .476 || .286 || .714 || 1.3 || 1.3 || .3 || .1 || 3.9
|-class="sortbottom"
|style="text-align:center;" colspan=2| Career
| 58 ||  || 25.5 || .440 || .244 || .688 || 2.9 || 2.6 || .9 || .3 || 7.5

Coaching record

Source: 

|-
| align="left" |Boston
| align="left" |
|82||56||26||.683|| align="center" |1st in Atlantic||11||5||6||.455
| align="center" |Lost in Conf. Semi-finals
|-
| align="left" |Boston
| align="left" |
|82||51||31||.622|| align="center" |1st in Atlantic||10||6||4||.600
| align="center" |Lost in Conf. Semi-finals
|-
| align="left" |Boston
| align="left" |
|82||48||34||.585|| align="center" |2nd in Atlantic||4||1||3||.350
| align="center" |Lost in first round
|-
| align="left" |Boston
| align="left" |
|82||32||50||.390|| align="center" |5th in Atlantic||—||—||—||—
| align="center" |Missed Playoffs
|-
| align="left" |Boston
| align="left" |
|82||35||47||.427|| align="center" |3rd in Atlantic||4||1||3||.350
| align="center" |Lost in first round
|-
| align="left" |Milwaukee
| align="left" |
|82||33||49||.402|| align="center" |7th in Central||—||—||—||—
| align="center" |Missed Playoffs
|-
| align="left" |Milwaukee
| align="left" |
|82||36||46||.439|| align="center" |7th in Central||—||—||—||—
| align="center" |Missed Playoffs
|-
| align="left" |L.A. Clippers
| align="left" |
|50||9||41||.180|| align="center" |7th in Pacific||—||—||—||—
| align="center" |Missed Playoffs
|-
| align="left" |L.A. Clippers
| align="left" |
|45||11||34||.244|| align="center" |(fired)||—||—||—||—
| align="center" |—
|-
| align="left" |Philadelphia
| align="left" |
|30||12||18||.400|| align="center" |5th in Atlantic||—||—||—||—
| align="center" |Missed Playoffs
|-class="sortbottom"
| align="left" |Career
| ||699||323||376||.462|| ||29||13||16||.448

References

External links

 Basketball-Reference.com:  Chris Ford (as coach)

1949 births
2023 deaths
American men's basketball coaches
American men's basketball players
Basketball coaches from New Jersey
Basketball players from New Jersey
Boston Celtics assistant coaches
Boston Celtics head coaches
Boston Celtics players
Brandeis Judges men's basketball coaches
Detroit Pistons draft picks
Detroit Pistons players
Holy Spirit High School (New Jersey) alumni
Los Angeles Clippers head coaches
Milwaukee Bucks head coaches
Philadelphia 76ers assistant coaches
Philadelphia 76ers head coaches
Shooting guards
Small forwards
Sportspeople from Atlantic City, New Jersey
Villanova Wildcats men's basketball players